Carotegrast methyl (trade name Carogra) is a drug used for the treatment of ulcerative colitis.

Carotegrast methyl is a prodrug that has little pharmacological activity itself. The methyl ester, which is designed to enhance oral bioavailability, is hydrolyzed to a carboxylic acid, carotegrast, by the enzyme carboxylesterase 1 in the liver. Carotegrast  is an α4-integrin antagonist which prevents the chronic inflammation affecting the gastrointestinal tract in individuals with ulcerative colitis.

Carotegrast methyl received approval in Japan in March 2022 for the treatment of moderate ulcerative colitis in patients who had inadequate response to mesalazine.

References 

Prodrugs
Methyl esters
Chlorobenzenes
Benzamides
Dimethylamino compounds
Quinazolinones